Augustus Martin may refer to:

Augustus Marie Martin (1803–1875), bishop of Natchitoches
Augustus N. Martin (1847–1901), U.S. Representative from Indiana
Augustus Pearl Martin (1835–1902), mayor of Boston, Massachusetts, and American Civil War artillery officer
 C. Augustus Martin (born 1955), American scholar